Shoaybiyeh-ye Sharqi Rural District is a rural district (dehestan) in Shadravan District, Shushtar County, Khuzestan Province, Iran. At the 2006 census, its population was 7,314, in 1,203 families.  The rural district has 23 villages.

References 

Rural Districts of Khuzestan Province
Shushtar County